Taiwan Public Television Service Foundation (PTS Foundation/Public Television Service Foundation), also called Public Television Service (PTS), is the first independent public broadcasting institution in Taiwan, which broadcasts the Public Television Service Taiwan. Although first proposed in 1980, it was not until 1984 that the executive-level Government Information Office (GIO), which regulates mass media activities and serves as the government press bureau, attempted to create a separate entity that would produce public interest programs for broadcast on the then-existing three terrestrial networks. Nevertheless, the Executive Yuan (one of Taiwan's five branches of government or yuans, and the one responsible for the GIO) later shifted the responsibility to the preexisting Chinese Public Television Broadcasting Development Fund. It was not until the early 1990s, following the lifting of martial law, that legislative efforts striving to create a public television station emerged in earnest. After much political wrangling and outcries over public and private resources used in lobbying and advocacy efforts, the final statutes creating PTS were enacted in 1997.

A Part of TBS
Taiwan PTS is operated by the Public Television Service Foundation, which is a nonprofit, as an independent public service broadcaster.

History
In 2006, The Legislative Yuan completed the third reading and approved the Statute Regarding the Disposition of Government Shareholdings in the Terrestrial Television Industry, paving the road for Taiwan Broadcasting System (TBS). After Liming Foundation donates Chinese Television System (CTS) shares to the PTS Foundation, TBS was formed as a result. In 2007, Taiwan Indigenous Television (TITV), Hakka TV, and Taiwan Macroview Television (MACTV) join Taiwan Broadcasting System, completed the structure of TBS.

In 2020 the Taiwanese Ministry of Culture announced that they would be providing PTS with funding to produce English language programming. The following year, PTS launched PTS World Taiwan as "an international YouTube channel that offers an incredible variety of programmes for viewers worldwide"; the channel features content mainly in Mandarin and Taiwanese with English subtitles.

PTS Channels
PTS
PTS Taigi
PTS3 (formerly called HiHD, PTS HD, the first high-definition channel in Taiwan)

See also
 List of Taiwanese television series
 Taiwan Indigenous Television (TITV)
 Censorship in Taiwan
 Press Freedom Index

References

External links
 Taiwan Public Television Service Foundation page:  Official English,  Chinese
  Official Youtube page
 PTS WORLD TAIWAN (with English subtitles)
 Public TV supporters protest political interference - The China Post
 Legislature to broadcast sessions live from Friday - Taipei Times

Television stations in Taiwan
Chinese-language television stations
Television channels and stations established in 1998
Publicly funded broadcasters
Taiwan Broadcasting System
2006 mergers and acquisitions